Eight Hundred Leagues on the Amazon is a novel by Jules Verne, published in 1881. It has also been published as The Giant Raft.

It is an adventure novel, involving how Joam Garral, a ranch owner living near the Peruvian-Brazilian border on the Amazon River, is forced to travel downstream when his past catches up with him. Most of the novel is situated on a large jangada (a Brazilian timber raft) that is used by Garral and his family to float to Belém, at the river's mouth. Many aspects of the raft, scenery, and journey are described in detail.

Plot summary

Joam Garral grants his daughter's wish to travel to Belém, where she wants to marry Manuel Valdez in the presence of Manuel's invalid mother. The Garrals travel down the Amazon River using a giant timber raft. At Belém, Joam plans to restore his good name, as he is still wanted in Brazil for a crime he did not perpetrate. A scoundrel named Torres offers Joam absolute proof of Joam's innocence, but the price that Torres wants for this information is to marry Joam's daughter, which is inconceivable to Joam. The proof lies in an encrypted letter that will exonerate Garral. When Torres is killed, the Garral family must race to decode the letter before Joam is executed.

References

External links

 

Novels by Jules Verne
1881 French novels
Novels set in Brazil
Belém
Brazil in fiction
Novels about cryptography
French novels adapted into films